Short Cut or The Short Cut or Short Cuts may refer to:

Books
 Short Cuts (manga)
 Short Cuts: Selected Stories, a 1993 compilation of stories by Raymond Carver to accompany the film Short Cuts by Robert Altman
 Short Cut, by John Denton, illustrated by Margery Gill 1980
 The Short Cut, by Ennio Flaiano 1950
 The Short Cut, by Jackson Gregory 1916
 Short Cuts, a service by Safari Books Online

Film
 Short Cuts, a 1993 film directed by Robert Altman
 Short Cuts (TV series), an Australian children's television series

 Short Cut, in the List of Pakistani films of 2009

Music
 "Short Cut" (song), a 2011 song by the Japanese idol group S/mileage+
 "Short Cut" by Tanya Tucker, composed by Lisa MacGregor for Here's Some Love 1976	
 "Short Cut" by Gateway, composed by John Abercrombie for Homecoming 1995

See also
Short Cuts, a radio show on BBC Radio 4 hosted by Josie Long
 Shortcut (disambiguation)